The Île de France was an international express train on the PBA route (Paris–Brussels–Amsterdam). The train was named after the French region surrounding Paris.

Trans Europ Express
The Île de France was the French share of the initial Trans Europ Express (TEE) services on the PBA route. On 2 June 1957 the TEE services on the PBA route started with three trains. One of them, the TEE L'Oiseau Bleu, only served the Paris–Brussels section; the other, the TEE Étoile du Nord, linked Amsterdam with Paris. Both were existing services upgraded to TEE and were operated by Dutch and Belgian railways. The Île de France was introduced as the "mirror" of the Étoile du Nord, that started in the morning in Amsterdam and returned to Amsterdam just before dinner. In order to have a morning service from Paris to Amsterdam, returning from Amsterdam in the evening the Île de France was added at the start of the TEE network.

Rolling stock
The SNCF initially used their RGP-825 diesel multiple units for this new TEE service. Meanwhile, the French started the development of locomotive-hauled TEE coaches and multi-system electric locomotives. The Swiss were the first to introduce quadruple-voltage TEE trainsets in 1961; the French presented their class CC 40100 in 1964. On 31 May 1964 the Île de France was the first locomotive-hauled TEE to use the specially made . On 2 August 1964 all TEE services on the PBA-route received Inox-PBA stock operated by the SNCF and NMBS. This stock stayed in use until the opening of the Paris–Brussels high-speed railway in 1995. However, some modifications took place between 1983 and 1987, when a part of the coaches were refurbished to 2nd class and received a green band instead of a red (TEE) band above the windows.

Route and timetable
The timetable remained nearly unchanged during the whole period of service, although in 1984 the service was shortened to the Paris–Brussels part.

EuroCity 

In 1987 the Île de France was, like the other PBA TEE services, integrated into the new EuroCity network.

On 23 May 1993 the EuroCity services between Paris and Brussels were classified as TEE again. After the opening of the LGV Nord on 23 January 1995, the Brussels–Paris service was withdrawn and by the time this highspeed railway was fully operational on 26 May 1995 the opposite service was withdrawn too.

References

Works cited

EuroCity
International named passenger trains
Named passenger trains of Belgium
Named passenger trains of France
Named passenger trains of the Netherlands
Trans Europ Express
Railway services introduced in 1957
Railway services discontinued in 1995